Constrained equal awards (CEA), also called constrained equal gains, is a division rule for solving bankruptcy problems. According to this rule, each claimant should receive an equal amount, except that no claimant should receive more than his/her claim. In the context of taxation, it is known as leveling tax.

Formal definition 
There are n claimants. Usually, that is, the estate is insufficient to satisfy all the claims.

The CEA rule says that each claimant i should receive , where r is a constant chosen such that . The rule can also be described algorithmically as follows:

 Initially, all agents are active, and all agents get 0.
 While there are remaining units of the estate:
 The next estate unit is divided equally among all active agents.
 Each agent whose total allocation equals its claim becomes inactive.

Examples 
Examples with two claimants:

 ; here . In general, when all claims are at least , each claimant receives exactly .
 ;  here .

Examples with three claimants:

 ; here .
 ; here .
 ; here .
; here .
; here .

Usage 
In the Jewish law, if several creditors have claims to the same bankrupt debtor, all of which have the same precedence (e.g. all loans have the same date), then the debtor's assets are divided according to CEA.

"The ensuing laws apply when creditors whose promissory notes are dated on the same date all come to expropriate property together... How is the property divided?
 If when the property is divided in equal portions according to the number of creditors, the person owed the least will receive the amount owed him or less, the property is divided into that number of equal portions.
 If dividing the property into equal portions would give the person owed the least more than he is owed, then... the person owed the least receives the money that he is owed. He then withdraws. The remaining creditors then divide the balance of the debtor's resources in the following manner.
 A person owed three debts: one of 100, one for 200 and one for 300. If all the resources of the debtor total 300, they are divided 100 for each. Similarly, if his resources are less than 300, they should be divided equally among the three.
 If his resources total more than 300 zuz, the 300 should be divided equally and then the person owed 100 should withdraw. The remaining money should be divided equally in this same manner.
 If the debtor's resources total 500 or less, the 300 should be divided equally, and then the person owed 100 should withdraw. The balance of 200 or less should then be divided equally among the remaining creditors, and then the second one withdraws.
 If the debtor's resources total 600, the 300 should be divided equally, and then the person owed 100 should withdraw. They then divide 200 between the two equally, and then the second one withdraws. The 100 that remain should then be given to the person owed 300; he thus receives only 300. The debtor's resources should be divided according to this pattern even if there are 100 creditors, if they come to divide the resources at the same time. "

Characterizations 
The CEA rule has several characterizations. It is the only rule satisfying the following sets of axioms:

 Equal treatment of equals, invariance under truncation of claims, and composition up;
 Conditional full compensation, and composition down;
 Conditional full compensation, and claims-monotonicity.

Dual rule 
The constrained equal losses (CEL) rule is the dual of the CEA rule, that is: for each problem , we have .

References 

Bankruptcy theory